The Premier Padmini was a four-seat saloon manufactured in India from 1964 to 2001 by Premier Automobiles Limited, a division of the Walchand Group, under license from Fiat and marketed initially as the Fiat 1100 Delight — and from 1974 as the Premier Padmini. The Padmini's primary competitors in the Indian market were the Hindustan Ambassador and Standard Herald. This famous car ruled the Indian car market and its popularity peaked during 1970s and 80s. Many celebrities of the time including Rajnikanth, Mammootty, Aamir Khan owned a Premier Padmini during its prime years. Known colloquially as the Pad, or Fiat (since the Padmini was originally a Fiat car), the Padmini is named after a 14th-century Rajput princess. Padmini translates to "she who sits on the lotus" and refers to the Goddess Lakshmi. It was also a common name for girls in India at the time.

History
The Fiat 1100D, based on the Fiat 1200 GranLuce Berlina, debuted in India in 1964 with a carburetted 1,089 cc four-cylinder petrol engine — rather than the 1,221 cc engine fitted to the GranLuce in Italy. The original transmission was a four-speed manual gearbox (without synchronized first gear), which drove the rear wheels via a live rear axle. Its shifter was mounted on the left of the steering column.

Premier manufactured the Padmini at their Kurla plant in Bombay (now Mumbai) until they sold a majority stake to Fiat SpA in September 1997. The licensed vehicle was initially marketed as the Fiat 1100 Delight. For model year 1973, it was marketed as the Premier President and subsequently as the Premier Padmini. At its peak during the 1970s and 1980s, the car achieved immense popularity among youngsters, celebrities and women. Compared to the Hindustan Ambassador, it looked more modern, was more fuel-efficient and was very easy to drive.

Premier began to offer an air-conditioner, leather upholstery, courtesy lights and tinted glass. These were considered luxuries in Indian cars at the time.

From the mid-1980s, with the advent of more modern, aesthetic and more fuel-efficient cars from Maruti Suzuki, the popularity of the Padmini slowly began to wane. The liberalisation of the Indian economy in 1991, which allowed foreign car manufacturers to launch operations in India, began the end for the Padmini. In 1996, Premier tried to revive the car's sagging fortunes with an updated model. A diesel variant, the 137D, was also introduced, with the hope of taking advantage of the rising popularity of diesel vehicles in India. Its engine was built under license from Fratelli Negri Macchine Diesel Sud (FNM), Italy, with a displacement of 1,366 cc and generating . Its top speed was close to 140 km/h, and its fuel efficiency was 24 km/L. Production was shut down because of PAL's management problems.

While all cars built by Premier were four-door sedans, small companies such as Starline also offered other bodywork, mainly in the form of estates.

In the 2010s numerous examples served as taxicabs in Mumbai, though these were being phased out due to regulations enacted in 2013 by the government disallowing vehicles over 20 years old. Many of these taxis now run on CNG for fuel economy.

Gallery

See also
Premier Automobiles Limited
Premier Padmini, a Kannada language film of same name
Pannaiyarum Padminiyum, a film in which the story is about the car and a family

References

External links
Premier Padminis at Sholavaram race track
 Fiat Club of Bangalore
 Fiat Club of Hyderabad

Cars of India
Cars introduced in 1964
Walchand Group